The Montreal Machine were the sole Canadian (and non-U.S. based North American) team in the World League of American Football (WLAF), a springtime developmental professional league set up by the National Football League (NFL) that played in 1991 and 1992. There were also three European teams and six North America-based teams. Like all WLAF teams, the Machine played American rules football, 11 players per side on a 120-yard long/53 1/3-yard wide field, rather than Canadian rules football of 12 players per side on a 150-yard wide/65-yard wide field.

The Machine filled a void created by the folding of the Canadian Football League's Montreal Alouettes in 1987. It was the first American football team in Canada since the Montreal Beavers, Toronto Rifles and Victoria Steelers, which all played in the Continental Football League in 1967. The NFL had also played two international preseason games in Montreal in 1988 and 1990 during the Alouettes' absence.

After two years, the Machine, and the entire WLAF, were put on "hiatus" by the NFL. In 1995, the three European-based franchises (and three more) were reconstituted as the World League (later known as NFL Europe); the North American teams were folded, thus becoming a purely European league. The Machine played their home games at Olympic Stadium in Montreal, which also hosted what would be the WLAF's last game in its original incarnation, World Bowl '92. A crowd of 43,789 watched the Sacramento Surge defeat the Orlando Thunder, 21-17.

The Machine's average game attendance was 31,888 in their first year of play, well above the league average and above expectations. It dropped to 25,254 in their second (and final) year, still in line with league average.

The end of the WLAF's North American operations was soon followed by the CFL commencing its own U.S. expansion experiment, which lasted for three seasons. The subsequent demise of the CFL's U.S. teams coincided with pro football's return to Montreal in 1996 when the third and current incarnation of the Montreal Alouettes commenced play. The Alouettes had been revived by the owners of the Baltimore Stallions, the most successful of the CFL's American franchises, who upon shuttering their U.S.-based team relocated their football organization to Montreal.

Season-by-season

1991 season

Personnel

Staff

Roster

Results
Week 1: Sat. Mar. 23 - 8:00 pm EDT - (W) Montreal 20 @ Birmingham Fire 5 (Legion Field - 52,942) USA/TSN-RDS
Week 2: Mon. Apr. 1 - 8:00 pm EDT - (L) Montreal 10 vs. Barcelona Dragons 34 (Olympic Stadium - 53,238) USA/TSN-RDS
Week 3: Mon. Apr. 8 - 8:00 pm EDT - (W) Montreal 23 vs. Birmingham Fire 10 (Olympic Stadium - 27,766) USA/TSN-RDS
Week 4: Sat. Apr. 13 - 8:00 pm EDT - (L) Montreal 0 vs. New York/New Jersey Knights 44 (Olympic Stadium - 34,821) USA/TSN-RDS
Week 5: Sat. Apr. 20 - 2:00 pm EDT - (L) Montreal 7 @ London Monarchs 45 (Wembley Stadium - 35,294) TV EURO/TSN-RDS
Week 6: Sat. Apr. 27 - 3:00 pm EDT - (L) Montreal 7 @ Frankfurt Galaxy 17 (Waldstadion - 25,269) TV5/TSN-RDS
Week 7: Sat. May. 4 - 8:00 pm EDT - (W) Montreal 26 @ Sacramento Surge 23 (OT) (Hughes Stadium - 17,326) USA/TSN-RDS
Week 8: Mon. May. 13 - 8:00 pm EDT - (W) Montreal 15 vs. Raleigh-Durham Skyhawks 6 (Olympic Stadium - 20,123) USA/TSN-RDS
Week 9: Sun. May. 19 - 12:30 pm EDT - (L) Montreal 10 @ San Antonio Riders 27 (Alamo Stadium - 20,234) ABC/RDS
Week 10: Mon. May. 27 - 8:00 pm EDT - (L) Montreal 27 vs. Orlando Thunder 33 (OT) (Olympic Stadium - 23,493) USA/TSN-RDS

1992 season

Personnel

Roster

Results
Week 1: San Antonio Riders 17, Montreal 16
Week 2: Montreal 31, Orlando Thunder 29
Week 3: Sacramento Surge 14, Montreal 7
Week 4: Montreal 31, Ohio Glory 20
Week 5: Orlando Thunder 16, Montreal 8
Week 6: New York/New Jersey Knights 34, Montreal 11
Week 7: Sacramento Surge 35, Montreal 21
Week 8: Birmingham Fire 23, Montreal 16 (OT)
Week 9: London Monarchs 45, Montreal 13
Week 10: New York/New Jersey Knights 41, Montreal 21

References

Sports teams in Montreal
American football teams established in 1991
American football teams disestablished in 1992
NFL Europe (WLAF) teams
Defunct American football teams in Canada
1991 establishments in Quebec
1992 disestablishments in Quebec